Viopapa Annandale–Atherton (also known as Papali'i Dr Viopapa Annandale–Atherton) is a Samoan medical doctor who has worked to improve the health of women and children in the Pacific Islands. She was the first Pacific Island woman to graduate from a New Zealand university.

Early life and education 
Born in Samoa, Annandale–Atherton is the daughter of Edward Annandale and Sina Nelson. Annandale–Atherton received a scholarship to study at Epsom Girls Grammar School. She studied medicine at the University of Otago, graduating MB ChB in 1964.

Career 
After graduation Annandale–Atherton went to Edinburgh where she was a house surgeon at the Royal Infirmary. She studied at the London School of Hygiene and Tropical Medicine receiving a Diploma in Tropical Health.

Annandale–Atherton has served on many health organisations: the World Health Organisation's (WHO) advisory committee on long-acting contraceptives, as head of Samoa's Maternal and Child Health Department (1971–1982), one of the founders of a school for special needs (1979), on a Samoan body looking into domestic violence and human rights (1994), and president of Soroptimist International of Samoa.

In 1992, after many years of moving between the United Kingdom and Samoa, she returned to Samoa to set up a general practice.

Annandale–Atherton has worked to improve the health and welfare of women and children in the Pacific Islands. This has included obtaining international funding for projects from USAID, the EU and WHO to support women and children, and initiating family planning services and vaccination programmes in Samoa. She has been active in the Pan–Pacific and South East Asian Women's Association and was international president from 2004 to 2010.

Honours and awards 
Annandale–Atherton received an Honorary Doctorate of Law from the University of Otago in 2019.

Personal life 
Annandale–Atherton's great-grandfather was Thomas Annandale, a Professor of Clinical Surgery in Scotland.  

Her grandfather was Samoan businessman and politician Ta'isi Olaf Frederick Nelson.

She met her husband John Atherton in Edinburgh and they had two sons. Her father in law was Noel Atherton.

References

External links 
 Papali'i Doctor Viopapa Annandale Atherton interview on YouTube
Pan–Pacific and South East Asian Women's Association (PPSEAWA) website

University of Otago alumni
People educated at Epsom Girls' Grammar School
Living people
Samoan women
Samoan people of Scottish descent
Samoan physicians
Year of birth missing (living people)